The Deer Lodge Curling Club  located in Winnipeg, Manitoba, is a six-sheet curling club located in the west part of the city. The club was established in 1919 and moved to the current location in the 1950s. In 2023, the Thistle Curling Club announced that they would be selling their location and merging their club with Deer Lodge Curling Club. The two clubs would retain their history and identity but continue to operate out of the same facility beginning in the fall of 2023. Barry Fry curled out of Deer Lodge Curling Club when he won the 1979 Macdonald Brier, going on to win bronze at the 1979 World Championships.

References

External links

 Manitoba Historical Society
 Club website

Curling clubs established in 1919
Sports venues in Winnipeg
Curling clubs in Canada
1919 establishments in Manitoba
Curling in Winnipeg
Municipal Historical Resources of Winnipeg